Carberry is a surname. Notable people with the surname include:

John Vaughan, 1st Earl of Carberry  (1574/5–1634), Welsh courtier and politician
Anne Vaughan, Countess of Carberry (1663–1690), a daughter of George Savile, 1st Marquess of Halifax, and his first wife,

Bert Carberry (born 1931), Scottish footballer
Chris Carberry (born 1951), Australian rugby union player
Glen Carberry (1896–1976), American football player
John Carberry (1904–1998), Cardinal Archbishop of Saint Louis
Joseph E. Carberry (1887–1961), American aviator
Joseph Carberry (Wisconsin politician) (1853–1928), Wisconsin state legislator
Kay Carberry (born 1950), British trade unionist
Larry Carberry (1936–2015), English footballer
Liam Carberry (born 1993), English rugby league footballer 
Matthew Carberry (1911–1986), American sheriff
Michael Carberry (born 1980), English cricketer
Michael Carberry (rugby league), Australian former professional rugby league footballer 
Michael J. Carberry, American politician
Nina Carberry (born 1984), Irish jockey
Paul Carberry (born 1974), Irish jockey
Tommy Carberry (1941–2017), Irish jockey

Fictional characters:
Josiah S. Carberry, fictional professor of psychoceramics at Brown University and Wesleyan University

See also
 Carbery (disambiguation)

Scottish surnames
Toponymic surnames